Alexandre "Xande" Nascimento da Costa e Silva (born 16 March 1997) is a Portuguese professional footballer who plays as a winger or forward for French club Dijon.

In his career, he played for Vitória de Guimarães (first team and reserves), West Ham United, Aris and Nottingham Forest.

Silva was a youth international for Portugal.

Club career

Vitória Guimarães
Born in Porto, Silva joined Vitória de Guimarães' academy at the age of 17 after a five-year spell at Sporting CP. He started his senior career with the former's reserves, making his Segunda Liga debut on 17 August 2014 by coming on as a late substitute in a 1–0 away loss against Oliveirense. He scored his first goal in the competition the following 18 January, helping the hosts beat Benfica B 4–1.

Silva's first appearance in the Primeira Liga took place in the penultimate match of the season, and he played 11 minutes in a 0–0 home draw with Benfica after replacing Otávio. His maiden league goal occurred on 7 December 2015, in a 3–1 home defeat of Rio Ave.

West Ham United
Silva joined West Ham United for an undisclosed fee on 2 August 2018, signing a three-year contract and being recruited initially for the under-23 team. He scored a four-minute hat-trick on his Premier League 2 debut 11 days later, against Tottenham Hotspur.

Silva made his Premier League debut on 30 December 2018 in a 2–0 away defeat to Burnley, coming on as a second-half substitute for Marko Arnautović. He missed the start of the 2019–20 season due to illness; rushed into hospital in Portugal, he underwent emergency bowel surgery from which he was recuperating.

On 5 October 2020, Silva was loaned to Aris for the season. He scored his first goal in the Super League Greece on 2 December, his individual effort capping the 3–0 win at AEL.

Nottingham Forest
On 31 August 2021, Silva joined EFL Championship club Nottingham Forest on a two-year deal for an undisclosed fee. His maiden appearance took place on 15 September, when he replaced Lyle Taylor midway through the second half of an eventual 0–2 home loss against Middlesbrough.

Dijon
On 2 August 2022, Silva signed a three-year contract with Dijon for an undisclosed fee.

International career
Silva was capped by Portugal at every youth level between under-15 and under-20. He was part of the under-17 squad that reached the semi-finals of the 2014 UEFA European Championship, and was named in the Team of the Tournament.

Two years later, Silva helped the under-19 team to the semi-finals of the 2016 European Championship in Germany. He was then selected by under-20 manager Emílio Peixe for the 2017 FIFA U-20 World Cup, where he scored in the quarter-final against Uruguay, which they lost after a penalty shootout.

Personal life
Silva's father, Joaquim, was also a footballer. Also a forward, he spent most of his career in China and Portugal and represented the Angola national team.

Career statistics

Club

References

External links

Portuguese League profile 
National team data 

1997 births
Living people
Portuguese sportspeople of Angolan descent
Black Portuguese sportspeople
Portuguese footballers
Footballers from Porto
Association football wingers
Association football forwards
Primeira Liga players
Liga Portugal 2 players
C.F. Os Belenenses players
Vitória S.C. B players
Vitória S.C. players
Premier League players
English Football League players
West Ham United F.C. players
Nottingham Forest F.C. players
Super League Greece players
Aris Thessaloniki F.C. players
Ligue 2 players
Dijon FCO players
Portugal youth international footballers
Portuguese expatriate footballers
Expatriate footballers in England
Expatriate footballers in Greece
Expatriate footballers in France
Portuguese expatriate sportspeople in England
Portuguese expatriate sportspeople in Greece
Portuguese expatriate sportspeople in France